Tattenhall Hall is a country house standing to the south of the village of Tattenhall, Cheshire, England. The house is designated by English Heritage as a Grade II* listed building.

The house was built in the early part of the 17th century, before 1622, for Richard Bostock. Sir J Bradshaw of Chester owned the house by 1666 and it later became a farmhouse.

The house was bought in 1856 by Robert Barbour who restored the house and commissioned Thomas Harrison to design gate piers and farm buildings. In the early 20th century the owners were the Cooke family.

Architecture

The house is constructed in brick with sandstone dressings and a Welsh slate roof, and is an early example of a brick building in Cheshire.  The architectural style is Jacobean.  It has an irregular H-shaped plan, in two and three storeys, with an entrance front of five bays.  It contains two gables that are similar in style, but have difference in heights, suggesting that they were designed separately. Much of the interior of the building is from 1858; however, some of the Jacobean panelled window seats and wainscoting survive.

Associated with the hall are two structures listed at Grade II.  The sandstone gate piers and wing walls were built probably in 1858 and designed by Thomas Harrison.  The hay barn to the southeast of the hall was built in 1858 and was also designed by Harrison.

Since 1994 the gardens have been laid out and the pond dug out. Taking inspiration from the grounds at Great Dixter wild flower meadows have been created using plants such as Betonica officinalis.

See also
Listed buildings in Tattenhall

References

Houses completed in 1622
Country houses in Cheshire
Grade II* listed buildings in Cheshire
Grade II* listed houses
1622 establishments in England